KakaoPay (Hangul: 카카오페이) is a mobile payment and digital wallet service by Kakao based in South Korea that allows users make mobile payments and online transactions. The service supports contactless payments using near-field communications and QR codes.

KakaoPay is incorporated into KakaoTalk, the mobile instant messenger from Kakao.

Service
The payment service first launched on September 4, 2014 with integration with their messaging app, KakaoTalk, allowing people to request and send money to people in their contacts. Since its launch, Kakao has expanded into other financial services by launching their own online bank called Kakao Bank and releasing their own debit card. In April 2017, KakaoPay Co., Ltd. was established to run the payment services operated by the company.

KakaoPay crossed the 10 million user mark after 20 months since its launch. More features have been added to the service like the ability to send remittances, send invoices, and complete online transactions on mobile. With the rapid increase in users and payment transactions, KakaoPay received a $200M investment from Alibaba's Ant Financial, the parent company of Alipay, a mobile payment service in China.

References

Sites That Accept KakaoPay 

 Coupang (쿠팡)
 Yogiyo (요기요)
 Interpark (인터파크)

Kakao
Mobile payments in South Korea